was a Japanese football player and manager. He managed Japan national team.

Coaching career
Kudo was born in Iwate, Iwate on February 4, 1909. In 1933, he graduated from Waseda University and he became manager for Waseda University. In 1936, he became assistant coach for Japan national team for 1936 Summer Olympics in Berlin. Japan completed a come-from-behind victory against Sweden. The first victory in Olympics for the Japan and the historic victory over one of the powerhouses became later known as "Miracle of Berlin" (ベルリンの奇跡) in Japan. In 2016, this team was elected Japan Football Hall of Fame. In 1942, he became manager for Japan national team. In 1957, he managed Waseda University again until 1966.

On September 21, 1971, Kudo died of heart failure in Suginami, Tokyo at the age of 62.

References

External links
Japan Football Hall of Fame (Japan team at 1936 Olympics) at Japan Football Association

1909 births
1971 deaths
Waseda University alumni
Association football people from Iwate Prefecture
Japanese footballers
Japanese football managers
Japan national football team managers
Association football goalkeepers